The Miramar Open was a golf tournament on the Tour Argentino de Profesionales, formerly the principal professional golf tour in Argentina. The tournament has been played only three times, the first in 1983; it has always been held at the Links Miramar Golf Club, in Miramar, Buenos Aires Province. It was last held in 2004.

Winners

Golf tournaments in Argentina